Galit Dahan Carlibach (in Hebrew גלית דהן קרליבך, born 1981) is an Israeli author. She has published 7 books, short stories, essays and travel-literature.

Biography 
Dahan Carlibach was born in 1981 in the development town of Sderot. She grew up there and in Ashdod and Jerusalem. She studied screenwriting in the Ma'aleh school in Jerusalem.

Some of her work has been translated to English, Spanish and German. Her short story Linber was included in the bilingual German-Hebrew collection We Don't Forget, We Go Dancing, and won first prize in the competition of the online magazine Berlin Today. Other short stories have appeared in English in Lilith (magazine) and Tablet magazine.

Her first Novel was published in 2010, to critical and commercial acclaim.

Awards and Grants 
Prime Minister's Prize for Hebrew Literary Works (2014)
ACUM Devora Omer Award (2014)
 National Library of Israel Pardes scholarship for young writers (2013-2014)
 Fulbright International writing program of Iowa University, where she wrote three short stories (2016)
Shanghai writing program, 2017

Works

Novels
 The Locked Garden, Kinneret-Zmora-Bitan, 2010  
 Ghost Town, Booxilla (digital publisher), 2014  
 The Hedge, Kinneret-Zmora-Bitan ,2014  
 Alice's Storm, Kinneret-Zmora-Bitan, 2017
It's me, Iowa, Graff, 2018

Young adult titles
Arpilea fantasy series
Book 1: Mystia, Kinneret-Zmora-Bitan, 2013  
Book 2: The Return Of Ten Times, Kinneret-Zmora-Bitan, 2015

References

External links 
 Galit Dahan-Carlibach's official website

Israeli opinion journalists
Israeli children's writers
Israeli women children's writers
1981 births
Living people
Recipients of Prime Minister's Prize for Hebrew Literary Works